Statistics of Ekstraklasa for the 1984–85 season.

Overview
The league was contested by 16 teams, and Górnik Zabrze won the championship.

League table

Results

Top goalscorers

References

External links
 Poland – List of final tables at RSSSF 

Ekstraklasa seasons
1984–85 in Polish football
Pol